The 13th Hussars (previously the 13th Light Dragoons) was a cavalry regiment of the British Army established in 1715. It saw service for three centuries including the Napoleonic Wars, the Crimean War and the First World War but then amalgamated with the 18th Royal Hussars, to form the 13th/18th Royal Hussars in 1922.

History

Early wars
The regiment was raised in the Midlands by Richard Munden as Richard Munden’s Regiment of Dragoons in 1715 as part of the response to the Jacobite rebellion. It took part in the Battle of Preston in November 1715 after which it escorted the rebels to the nearest prisons. The regiment was sent to Ireland in 1718 and remained there until 1742.

During the 1745 Jacobite Rising, it was commanded by James Gardiner; largely composed of recruits, on 16 September the regiment was routed by a small party of Highlanders in the so-called 'Coltbridge Canter.' Demoralised by this, it did the same at the Battle of Prestonpans on 21 September, which lasted 15 minutes and where Gardiner was killed and the equally disastrous Battle of Falkirk Muir in January 1746. Shortly after this, Gardiner's replacement Francis Ligonier died of sickness and was replaced by Philip Naison.

The regiment returned to Ireland in 1749 and was re-titled the 13th Regiment of Dragoons in 1751. It was involved in putting down a minor rebellion by George Robert FitzGerald in 1781 and it converted to the light role in 1783. A detachment from the regiment was sent to Jamaica in September 1795 and returned in July 1798.

Peninsular War

In February 1810 the regiment sailed for Lisbon for service in the Peninsular War. It took part in the Battle of Campo Maior on the Spanish-Portuguese border on 25 March 1811 in a clash that occurred between British and Portuguese cavalry, under Robert Ballard Long, and a force of French infantry and cavalry under General Latour-Maubourg. The regiment, two and a half squadrons strong, led by Colonel Michael Head, charged and routed a superior French cavalry force of no less than six squadrons. The regiment, with two Portuguese squadrons, then went on to pursue the French for seven miles to the outskirts of Badajoz. The report reaching Lord Wellington seems to have glossed over the epic quality of the charge and emphasised the overlong pursuit.  After receiving Marshal Beresford's report, Wellington issued a particularly harsh reprimand to the regiment calling them "a rabble" and threatening to remove their horses from them and send the regiment to do duty at Lisbon. The officers of the regiment then wrote a collective letter to Wellington detailing the particulars of the action. Wellington is reported as saying that had he known the full facts he would never have issued the reprimand. The historian Sir John Fortescue wrote, "Of the performance of Thirteenth, who did not exceed two hundred men, in defeating twice or thrice their numbers single-handed, it is difficult to speak too highly."

The regiment formed part of Beresford's Allied-Spanish Army at the Battle of Albuera on 16 May 1811. The French army, commanded by Marshal Jean-de-Dieu Soult, Duc de Dalmatie, was attempting to relieve the French garrison of the border fortress of Badajoz. Only after bloody and fierce fighting, and the steadfastness of the British infantry, did the allies carry the day. The regiment, which was unbrigaded, formed part of the cavalry force commanded initially by Brigadier Robert Ballard Long and, later in the battle, by Major General Sir William Lumley.

The regiment also saw action at the Battle of Arroyo dos Molinos in October 1811, at the Siege of Badajoz in March 1812 and, as part of the 2nd Brigade under Colonel Colquohon Grant, at the Battle of Vitoria in June 1813. The regiment advanced into France and fought at the Battle of the Nive in December 1813, at the Battle of Orthez  in February 1814 and at the Battle of Toulouse in April 1814.

Waterloo

The regiment, commanded by Lieutenant-Colonel Shapland Boyse and forming part of the 7th Cavalry Brigade, but operationally attached to the 5th Cavalry Brigade, next took part in the Battle of Waterloo in June 1815. The regiment charged repeatedly during the day and completely routed a square of French infantry. An officer of the 13th wrote:
 Our last and most brilliant charge, was at the moment that Lord Hill, perceiving the movement of the Prussian army, and finding the French Imperial Guard on the point of forcing a part of the British position, cried out, - "Drive them back, 13th!" such an order from such a man, could not be misconstrued, and it was punctually obeyed. At that battle the armies of Field Marshal the Duke of Wellington and Generalfeldmarschall Gebhard Leberecht von Blücher decisively defeated the armies of the Emperor Napoleon Bonaparte.

The Crimean War

The regiment next saw action, as part of the light brigade under the command of Major General the Earl of Cardigan, at the Battle of Alma in September 1854. The regiment was in the first line of cavalry on the right flank during the Charge of the Light Brigade at the Battle of Balaclava in October 1854. The brigade drove through the Russian artillery before smashing straight into the Russian cavalry and pushing them back; it was unable to consolidate its position, however, having insufficient forces and had to withdraw to its starting position, coming under further attack as it did so. The regiment lost three officers and 38 men in the debacle. Lance-Sergeant Joseph Malone of the E Troop was awarded the Victoria Cross for his actions during the battle. The regiment also took part in the Battle of Inkerman in November 1854: the regiment played a minor role, although Captain Jenyns complained:

They put us under a very heavy fire at Inkerman, but luckily for us - and no thanks to any General - we had a slight rise on our flank, which ricocheted the balls just over our heads. Some ship's shells bowled over a few men and horses though. It was useless, as we could not act.

The regiment went on to take part in the Siege of Sevastopol in winter 1854. On 8 April 1861 the regiment was renamed the 13th Hussars and in April 1862 the regiment started wearing hussar clothing. The regiment departed for Canada in September 1866 as part of the response to the Fenian raids and sailed for India in January 1874. Robert Baden-Powell, the future leader of the scouts, joined the regiment in India in 1876. The regiment served in Afghanistan but saw no action during the Second Anglo-Afghan War.

The Second Boer War

The regiment arrived in South Africa in December 1899 and took part in the Battle of Colenso during the Second Boer War. It formed part of Colonel Burn-Murdoch’s Brigade and had a minor part in the Relief of Ladysmith in February 1900. The regiment stayed in South Africa throughout the hostilities, which ended with the Peace of Vereeniging on 31 May 1902. Following the end of the war, 556 officers and men of the regiment left South Africa on the SS City of Vienna, which arrived at Southampton in October 1902.

First World War

The regiment, which was based in Meerut in India at the start of the war, landed in Marseille as part of the 7th (Meerut) Cavalry Brigade in the 2nd Indian Cavalry Division in December 1914 for action on the Western Front. The regiment then moved to Mesopotamia, with the same brigade, in July 1916. The regiment took part in the Second Battle of Kut in February 1917, the capture of Baghdad in March 1917 and the Battle of Sharqat in October 1918. At Sharquat the regiment charged the hill where the Turkish guns were, and made a dismounted charge up it with fixed bayonets, successfully capturing the guns: İsmail Hakkı Bey, the Turkish commander, was aware of the peace talks at Mudros, and decided to spare his men rather than fight or break out, surrendering on 30 October 1918. In 1922 the regiment amalgamated with the 18th Royal Hussars to form the 13th/18th Royal Hussars.

Regimental museum
The regimental collection is held by the Discovery Museum in Newcastle upon Tyne.

Colonels 
The colonels of the regiment were as follows:
13th Regiment of Dragoons
1715 Brig-Gen. Richard Munden — Munden's Regiment of Dragoons
1722 F.M. Sir Robert Rich — Rich's Regiment of Dragoons
1725 Maj-Gen. William Stanhope, 1st Earl of Harrington — Stanhope's Regiment of Dragoons
1730 Lt-Gen. Henry Hawley — Hawley's Regiment of Dragoons
1740 Col. Robert Dalway — Dalway's Regiment of Dragoons
1741 Lt-Gen. Humphrey Bland — Bland's Regiment of Dragoons
1743 Col. James Gardiner, killed at Prestonpans, September 1745; Gardiner's Regiment of Dragoons
1745 Col. Francis Ligonier; died of pleurisy, 26 January 1746; Ligonier's Regiment of Dragoons
1746 Col. Peter Naison — Naison's Regiment of Dragoons

A royal warrant provided that in future regiments would not be known by their colonels' names, but by their "number or rank" on 1 July 1751
1751 Maj-Gen. Sir Charles Powlett
1751 F.M. Henry Seymour Conway
1754 Gen. John Mostyn
1758 Lt-Gen. Archibald Douglas
1778 Lt-Gen. Sir Richard Pierson
1781 Gen. Francis Craig

From 1783 13th Regiment of Light Dragoons:
1811 Gen. Hon. Sir Henry George Grey
1845 Gen. Hon. Edward Pyndar Lygon
1860 Lt-Gen. Allan Thomas Maclean

From 1861 13th Hussars:
1868 Gen. John Lawrenson
1871 Lt-Col Fitzroy Maclean
1883 Lt-Gen. Broadley Harrison
1890 Lt-Gen. Richard Buckley Prettejohn
1891 Gen. Sir William Henry Seymour
1894 Gen. Sir Baker Russell
1911 Lt-Gen. Robert Baden-Powell, 1st Baron Baden-Powell

In 1922 the regiment amalgamated with the 18th Royal Hussars to form the 13th/18th Royal Hussars

Battle honours
The regiment’s battle honours were as follows:
Early Wars:  Albuhera, Vittoria, Orthes, Toulouse, Peninsula, Waterloo, Alma, Balaklava, Inkerman, Sevastopol,  Relief of Ladysmith, South Africa 1899-1902
The Great War:  France and Flanders 1914-16, Kut al Amara 1917, Baghdad, Sharqat, Mesopotamia 1916-18

See also
British cavalry during the First World War

References

Sources

External links

The 13th Light Dragoons in the Crimea (The EJ Boys Archive)
The 13th Hussars in the Great War at Project Gutenberg

13 Light Dragoons
Hussar regiments of the British Army
H13
Regiments of the British Army in the Crimean War
Military units and formations disestablished in 1922
1715 establishments in Great Britain
Military units and formations established in 1715